Nosferattus discus is a jumping spider.

Etymology
The epitheton is Latin for "disc" and refers to the shape of the cymbium.

Appearance
N. discus is about 4 mm long, with females slightly larger.

Distribution
N. discus is only known from the State of Maranhão in Brazil.

External links
Three new genera of jumping spider from Brazil (Araneae, Salticidae) (2005)

Sitticini
Spiders of Brazil
Spiders described in 2005